Bik'at HaYarden Regional Council (Mo'atza Azorit Bik'at HaYarden, lit. Jordan Valley Regional Council), also Aravot HaYarden (lit. Jordan Plains) is a regional council covering 21 Israeli settlements in the Jordan Valley in the West Bank. The municipal territory of the council reaches from Mehola in the north, near the Beit She'an Valley, to Jericho in the south.

Most of the settlements are located on the two major north-south roads traversing the council's territory. The Allon Road on the west and Highway 90 on the east. The town of Ma'ale Efraim, a local council, is located within the regional council's borders, but constitutes an independent municipality. The regional council offices are located at the Shlomtzion regional centre.

As of 2021, David Elhayani is the head of the council.

List of villages
This regional council provides various municipal services for the villages within its territory:

Argaman (moshav)
Beka'ot (moshav)
Gilgal (kibbutz)
Gitit (moshav)
Hamra (moshav)
Hemdat (Nahal)
Maskiot (communal settlement)
Masua (moshav)
Mehola (moshav)
Mekhora (moshav)
Mevo'ot Yericho (communal settlement)

Netiv HaGdud (moshav)
Niran (kibbutz)
Na'omi (moshav)
Petza'el (moshav)
Ro'i (moshav)
Rotem (communal settlement)
Shadmot Mehola (moshav)
Tomer (moshav)
Yafit (moshav)
Yitav (moshav)

References

External links
Council website 
Emblem and short explanation Flags of the World
Aug 2008 Americans for Peace Now report on Jordan Valley settlements

 
Israeli regional councils in the West Bank